Mardare is a Moldovan and Romanian surname. Notable people with the surname include:

Andrian Mardare (born 1995), Moldovan javelin thrower
 Ștefan Mardare (born 1987),  Romanian footballer

Romanian-language surnames
Surnames of Moldovan origin